Monkhead is a  mountain summit located at the south end of Maligne Lake in Jasper National Park, in the Canadian Rockies of Alberta, Canada. Monkhead was named by the Alpine Club of Canada for its hood-like appearance similar to a monk. Its nearest higher peak is Mount Warren,  to the south-southeast.

Monkhead is situated at the far northwest extreme of the Brazeau Icefield. Monkhead is often seen in the background of iconic calendar photos of Spirit Island with Maligne Lake.


History

The mountain's name was officially adopted in 1946 by the Geographical Names Board of Canada. The first ascent of Monkhead was made in 1950 by Mr. and Mrs. Rex Gibson, D. LaChapelle, and E. LaChapelle.

Climate

Based on the Köppen climate classification, Monkhead is located in a subarctic climate with cold, snowy winters, and mild summers. Temperatures can drop below  with wind chill factors below . Precipitation runoff from Monkhead drains into the Maligne River, which is a tributary of the Athabasca River.

See also
Geography of the Rocky Mountains
Geography of Alberta

References

External links
 Parks Canada web site: Jasper National Park

Three-thousanders of Alberta
Mountains of Jasper National Park
Alberta's Rockies
Canadian Rockies